Pterolophia ligata is a species of beetle in the family Cerambycidae. It was described by Francis Polkinghorne Pascoe in 1862.

References

ligata
Beetles described in 1862